Hijazi script, also Hejazi, literally "relating to Hejaz", is the collective name for a number of early Arabic scripts that developed in the Hejaz region of the Arabian Peninsula, which includes the cities of Mecca and Medina. This type of script was already in use at the time of the emergence of Islam. A calligraphic Hijazi script is called a Ma'il script (مائل, "sloping"), these are found in a number of the earliest Qur'anic manuscripts. The two terms are often used interchangeably. 

Hijazi was one of the earliest scripts, along with Mashq and Kufic. Earlier scripts included the Ancient North Arabian and South Arabian script. 

The script is notably angular in comparison with other Arabic scripts and tends to slope to the right. The script does not yet contain any dots or diacritical marks to indicate vowel sounds: but does differentiate consonants by the intermittent use of dashes above the graphic letter forms.

Historicity
This writing study is based on the Qur'an manuscripts, and its aims are to determine the distinctions in the group by observing different criteria (channel, order etc). This approach allows the ancient manuscripts to be divided into two major types, the Hijazi script and the Kufic script. Kufic style also has its own subdivisions.

The term Hijazi was coined in the 19th century by Michele Amari, who distinguished between "Meccan script" and "Medinan script" from a 10th-century manuscript. Today, no element reinforces such a geographical distinction, and there is no clarity as to their certainty of geographic origin. Since the 1980s, the Kufic script has been referred to by François Déroche as a preference, with the definition of an "ancient Abbasid script".

The concept of a Hijazi scripts has been criticized by Estelle Whelan, who sees this definition as a "scientific artefact" based on the form of a single letter, (Elif) and archaic explanations.

See also 

 Thuluth
 Naskh
 Tawqi
 Muhaqqaq
 Rayhan
 Arabic calligraphy

References

External links 
 British Library MS. Or. 2165 Early Qur'anic manuscript written in Ma'il script, 7th or 8th century CE
 British Library MS. Or. 2165 (British Library)
 Ma'il manuscript from the Tareq Rajab Museum in Kuwait.
 Folio in an italic Hijazi script from the discoveries at the Great Mosque, Sana'a
 Fragment in a Makkan Hijazi script from the Vatican library

Arabic calligraphy
Hejaz